Park Tower is a  skyscraper in Sacramento, California, completed in 1991. The 26-story tower was the tallest in the city when completed. The building was named U.S. Bank Plaza until U.S. Bank moved to U.S. Bank Tower in 2008. Previously owned by the Shorenstein Company, the building was bought by Hines in 2017.

Gallery

See also 
U.S. Bank Tower (Sacramento)

References

External links
Park Tower website

Buildings and structures in Sacramento, California
Skyscraper office buildings in Sacramento, California
U.S. Bancorp
Kaplan McLaughlin Diaz buildings
1991 establishments in California
Office buildings completed in 1991